Lee Williams (born 19 December 1988) is a Welsh international rugby league footballer who plays for the Mackay Cutters in the Queensland Cup. He previously played for the Crusaders in the Super League, and for the South Wales Scorpions in the Championship One.

Background
Williams was born in Aberdare, Wales.

International honours
Lee Williams made his début for Wales while at Celtic Crusaders in 2008.

He featured in the 2009 European Cup game against Ireland scoring one try.

References

External links
(archived by web.archive.org) Celtic Crusaders profile

1988 births
Living people
Crusaders Rugby League players
Mackay Cutters players
Rugby league centres
Rugby league players from Aberdare
Rugby league wingers
South Wales Scorpions players
Wales national rugby league team players
Welsh rugby league players